Irvin Museng (born 13 June 1991) is an Indonesian footballer who previously played for Persiba Balikpapan in the Indonesia Super League. He is the top scorer in 2005 Danone Nations Cup tournament in French.

Achievement
 2005 Danone Nations Cup top scorer with 10 goals

Personal
His grandfather is Thauw Cin Sek, a famous retired soccer player.

References

External links
 
Irvin Museng goal.com

1993 births
Association football forwards
Association football midfielders
Living people
Indonesian footballers
Liga 1 (Indonesia) players
Pro Duta FC players
Persiba Balikpapan players
Indonesian people of Chinese descent
Indonesian sportspeople of Chinese descent
Sportspeople from Makassar
21st-century Indonesian people